List of arches in Oregon contains all natural rock arches identified by the USGS in the U.S. state of Oregon.  The USGS defines an arch as a natural arch-like opening in a rock mass (bridge, natural bridge, sea arch).

There are 15 listed as of December 12, 2008.

See also
 Lists of Oregon-related topics

References 

 
Arches